Lectionary 180, designated by siglum ℓ 180 (in the Gregory-Aland numbering) is a Greek manuscript of the New Testament, on parchment. Palaeographically it has been assigned to the 14th century.

Description 

The codex contains Lessons from the Gospels of John, Matthew, Luke lectionary (Evangelistarium) with lacunae. It is written in Greek minuscule letters, on 202 parchment leaves, in one column per page, 24 lines per page. The leaves at the beginning (1-8) and end were supplied on paper.

History 

M. Schauffler brought the manuscript from Constantinople to America.

Scholz gave number 180 for the manuscript 155.

The manuscript is not cited in the critical editions of the Greek New Testament (UBS3).

Currently the codex is located in the Harvard University, (Theol. Libr., Ms. 21) at Cambridge.

See also 

 List of New Testament lectionaries
 Biblical manuscript
 Textual criticism

Notes and references

Bibliography 

 G. C. Whipple, A Collation of the Lectionary of the Four Gospels, l 180, with the Textus Receptus, Boston University, 1947.
 K. W. Clark, A Descriptive Catalogue of Greek New Testament Manuscripts in America (Chicago, 1937), pp. 3-4.

Greek New Testament lectionaries
14th-century biblical manuscripts